FK Union Nové Zámky is a women's football team from Nové Zámky playing in the Slovak Women's Second League. The team has won the championship in 2013, 2014 and 2015 and won the Slovak cup in 2014 and 2015.

History
The team was founded in April 2002.

After losing the 2013 cup final, they won the national cup in 2014 after 28 penalty kicks. They then completed the double, when they defended their league title in 2014.

Honours
 Slovak Women's First League
Winner: 2012–13, 2013–14, 2014–15
 Slovak Women's Second League
Winner: 2018–19
 Slovak Women's Cup
Winner: 2014, 2015
Runner-up: 2013

Record in UEFA competitions

References

 
Women's football clubs in Slovakia
Sport in Nitra Region
Association football clubs established in 2002
2002 establishments in Slovakia